Egg grenade may refer to:

Model 17 grenade, German grenade used in World War I
Model 39 grenade, German grenade used in World War II

See also
Hand grenade, a generic term for any small bomb that can be thrown by hand
RGD-5, post World War II Soviet grenade shaped like an egg